Mohamed Sedki (born 25 August 1961) is an Egyptian footballer. He competed in the men's tournament at the 1984 Summer Olympics.

References

1961 births
Living people
Egyptian footballers
Egypt international footballers
Olympic footballers of Egypt
Footballers at the 1984 Summer Olympics
Place of birth missing (living people)
Association footballers not categorized by position
Mediterranean Games bronze medalists for Egypt
Mediterranean Games medalists in football
Competitors at the 1983 Mediterranean Games